The Maltese Second Division 2006-07 (known as BOV Second Division 2006-07 due to sponsorship reasons) started on 23 September 2006 and ended on 6 May 2007. Lija Athletic and St.Andrews were the relegated teams. The promoted teams were Birzebbuga St.Peters, Santa Venera Lightning and Rabat Ajax. Dingli Swallows finished the league as champions. Therefore, they were promoted to 2007–08 Maltese First Division. They were joined with Mellieha who finished as runner-up. Gudja United and Gozo FC were relegated to 2007–08 Maltese Third Division. Zebbug Rangers were also relegated as they lost the relegation-playoffs.

Participating teams
 Balzan Youths
 Birzebbuga St.Peters
 Dingli Swallows
 Gozo FC
 Gudja United
 Lija Athletic
 Melita
 Mellieha
 Rabat Ajax
 St.Andrews
 Santa Venera Lightning
 Zebbug Rangers

Changes from previous season

 Qormi and Vittoriosa Stars were promoted to 2006–07 Maltese First Division. They were replaced with Lija Athletic and St.Andrews, both relegated from 2005–06 Maltese First Division.
 Gzira United, Attard and Gharghur were relegated to 2006–07 Maltese Third Division. They were replaced with Birzebbuga St.Peters, Santa Venera Lightning and Rabat Ajax, all promoted from 2005–06 Maltese Third Division.

Final standings

Relegation playoffs

Top scorers

Results

See also
 2006–07 Maltese Second and Third Division Knock-Out

Maltese Second Division seasons
Malta
3